Tihu Nature Reserve is a nature reserve situated on Hiiumaa in western Estonia, in Hiiu County.

The nature reserve encompasses two lakes, Tihu and Vanajõe, Õngu mire, and an area of old-growth forest. The lakes form an important habitat for sea trout; the fish spawn in fresh water. The area is also a habitat for several unusual or threatened plants and insects, such as bog orchid, coralroot orchid, large white-faced darter and lilypad whiteface. The nature reserve is also an important habitat for the endangered European mink.

References

Nature reserves in Estonia
Geography of Hiiu County
Landforms of Hiiu County
Forests of Estonia
Wetlands of Estonia